Heliocheilus halimolimnus is a moth in the family Noctuidae. It is endemic to Queensland and South Australia.

The larvae possibly feed on Zygochloa paradoxa.

External links
Australian Faunal Directory

Heliocheilus
Moths of Australia